Vicente Mortes Alfonso (8 November 1921 – 21 May 1991) was a Spanish politician who served as Minister of Housing of Spain between 1969 and 1973, during the Francoist dictatorship.

References

1921 births
1991 deaths
Housing ministers of Spain
Government ministers during the Francoist dictatorship